Salem High School is a public high school in Salem, Virginia.  It is the sole high school for the City of Salem public school system.

Salem is an International Baccalaureate world school, certified for the Diploma Programme.

History

Salem High School was opened for the 1977-1978 school year by Roanoke County public schools to consolidate the student bodies of Andrew Lewis High School in Salem and Glenvar High School in western Roanoke County.  Beginning with the 1983-1984 school year, the city of Salem established a separate school district.  Glenvar High School was reopened.

Salem competed in the now defunct Group AAA Roanoke Valley District in the AAA Northwest Region when it was opened but dropped down to the Group AA Blue Ridge District in 1988, a few years after Glenvar's student population left.  When the Blue Ridge split in 2003, Salem was assigned to the new River Ridge District.  Salem was a member of Region III from 1988 to 2007.

Salem has won VHSL state championships in athletic and academic competitions. The football team plays in the Salem Football Stadium, and has won ten Group AA, Division 4 championships, in 1996, 1998, 1999, 2000, 2004, 2005, 2015, 2016, 2017 and spring 2021 (Covid-19 delayed 2020 season).  Salem has also won Group AA state titles in boys basketball (1994, 1999, 2013), boys tennis (1993, 1994, 2011), girls basketball (2013), girls volleyball (1998), girls soccer (2003), golf (2012), baseball (2018) and softball (1991).  The school's only Group AAA team state championship was won by the boys golf team in the spring of 1983.

The Quiz bowl team won the Group AA VHSL state championship in 2003) and the forensics team won in 2006, 2007, 2008, 2009, 2010, 2011, 2012, 2013, 2014, 2015, 2016, 2017, 2018, 2019. The forensics team holds the top four scores for team points in state forensics competition with 79 (2008), 69 (2007), 67 (2009), and 64 (2010).

Salem won the VHSL's Wachovia Cup in Group AA for academic competitions in the 2009-2010 school year.

Salem's FIRST Robotics Competition team 5724 Spartan Robotics attended FIRST Championship, the FIRST Robotics World Championship, in 2018 and 2019. Additionally, they won the Hampton Roads District Event in 2018 and were the Miami Valley Regional Champions in 2019.

Notable alumni
Mark Byington current head men's basketball coach at James Madison University. Class of 1994.
Dennis Haley a former NFL linebacker for the Baltimore Ravens, San Francisco 49ers, and New York Jets. Played college football at the University of Virginia. Class of 2000.
Alex Light NFL player
Adam Ward, photojournalist killed on live tv in August 2015 at Smith Mountain Lake while working for WDBJ in Roanoke, Virginia. Class of 2007.

References

Public high schools in Virginia
Schools in Salem, Virginia
1977 establishments in Virginia
Educational institutions established in 1977